Albane Dubois (born 1 April 1992) is a French sailor. She competed in the 49er FX event at the 2020 Summer Olympics.

References

External links
 
 
 

1992 births
Living people
French female sailors (sport)
Olympic sailors of France
Sailors at the 2020 Summer Olympics – 49er FX
Sportspeople from Roubaix
21st-century French women